Ozone is an unincorporated community and census-designated place (CDP) in Johnson County, Arkansas, United States. It was first listed as a CDP in the 2020 census with a population of 92. Ozone has a post office with ZIP code 72854.

Demographics

2020 census

Note: the US Census treats Hispanic/Latino as an ethnic category. This table excludes Latinos from the racial categories and assigns them to a separate category. Hispanics/Latinos can be of any race.

Notable people
Kenneth Henderson - Republican member of the Arkansas House of Representatives for Pope County; real estate developer in Russellville; former Ozone resident
C.W. Melson - Republican state representative for Johnson County from 1977 until his death on June 19, 1981, resided in Ozone.

References

Unincorporated communities in Johnson County, Arkansas
Census-designated places in Johnson County, Arkansas
Census-designated places in Arkansas